Gannet is an oil and gas field located in the United Kingdom's continental shelf in the North Sea. The field is located in Blocks 22/21, 22/25, 22/26 and 21/30. It is half-owned by Royal Dutch Shell (50%) and partly by ExxonMobil (50%) and has been operated by Shell UK Ltd since ‘first oil’ in November 1993. The Gannet A installation is the host platform for subsea tiebacks designated Gannet B to G. Like most Shell fields in the central and northern North Sea the field is named after a sea bird the gannet.

The Gannet reservoirs 
They comprises good quality turbiditic sands of a Tertiary age (Tay, Rogaland, Forties, Lista and Andrew Formations) and were discovered in 1973. The formation comprises a mixture of hydrocarbon reservoirs.
{| class="wikitable"
|+Gannet oil and gas reservoirs
!
!Location from Gannet A installation
!Reservoir type
!API gravity
!Reserves
!Wells
|-
|Gannet A
|––
|Oil rim with a gas cap
|40°
|68 million barrels of oil and  condensate; 411 billion cubic feet of gas
|11 wells
|-
|Gannet B
|5 km north-west
|Gas/condensate
|
|3 million barrels of condensate; 139  billion cubic feet of gas
|2 subsea wells
|-
|Gannet C
|5 km south-west
|Oil rim with a gas cap
|40°
|60 million barrels of oil; 140 billion  cubic feet of gas
|6 horizontal oil wells plus 2 gas  production wells
|-
|Gannet D
|16 km north-east
|Unsaturated oil without a gas cap
|40°
|31 million barrels of oil; 30 billion  cubic feet of gas
|5 subsea wells
|-
|Gannet E
|14 km
|Unsaturated heavy oil without a gas cap
|20°
|23 million barrels of heavy crude
|Subsea  well with electric submersible pump
|-
|Gannet F
|11 km
|Unsaturated oil without a gas cap
|40°
|19 million barrels of oil
|
|-
|Gannet G
|
|Unsaturated oil without a gas cap
|40°
|13 million barrels of oil
|2 subsea wells
|}

Design 
The topsides for Gannet were designed by Matthew Hall Engineering which was also responsible for procurement and construction and commissioning assistance. They were awarded the contract in July 1989. Initially there were facilities for 15 oil production wells, two gas production wells and seven spare slots; there was also provision for 39 subsea risers. The production capacity was 56,000 barrels of oil per day and 4.0 million standard cubic metres of gas per day. There are four production trains for both oil and gas processing. Electricity generation is powered by two 21-megawatt Rolls-Royce RB211 gas turbines. The topside accommodation was for 40 people. The integrated deck topsides (9600 tonnes) are supported by a four leg steel jacket (lift weight 8400 tonnes). The topsides were fabricated by Redpath Offshore North; and the jacket by RGC Offshore at Methil.

Operation 
Oil from the platform wellheads and subsea wells is routed to one of the three horizontal first stage 3-phase separators. Oil from the separators is combined and fed to common second, third and fourth stage 3-phase separators. Processed oil is exported by pipeline to the Fulmar A installation and thence via Norpipe to Teesside. Gas from the second, third and fourth stage separators is compressed to the operating pressure of the first stage separators with which it is combined and further compressed. Gas from the Gannet A gas wellheads and from the Gannet B and C subsea wells flows to one of the two vertical separators. Gas is co-mingled with the off-gas from the oil separators is dehydrated through counter-current contact with Triethylene glycol. Gas is compressed for export to St Fergus via the Fulmar gas pipeline. There are also facilities for gas injection into Gannet A, B and C reservoirs and for gas lift to oil production wells on reservoirs, A, C, D, E, F and G. Produced water is treated prior to overboard disposal.

Oil export capacity is 88,000 barrels per day. Gas compression and dehydration capacity is 246 million standard cubic feet per day. Gannet A has a gas lift capacity of 130 million standard cubic feet per day and a produced water handling capability of 60,000 barrels per day. Shell have indicated that there is greater than 25% ullage of the total system capability available in the plant for additional third party processing and transportation. Peak production was: Gannet A 1 million tonnes per year (1999); Gannet B 0.8 billion cubic metres per year (1996); Gannet C 1.6 million tonnes per year (1993); Gannet D 0.5 million tonnes per year (1994).

East of Gannet and Montrose Fields MPA(NC)

In 2014  of sea to the east of Gannet and the neighbouring Montrose oil field was declared a Nature Conservation Marine Protected Area under the title East of Gannet and Montrose Fields MPA(NC). The sands and gravels that form most of the seabed within the MPA are the preferred habitat for ocean quahog, which bury themselves deep into the sand to escape predation. When buried ocean quahog can survive long periods of time without food or oxygen, and are one of the longest living creatures on Earth, having a lifespan of more than 400 years.

The MPA also includes a band of offshore deep-sea mud which form a habitat for many species of worm and mollusc, who live buried in the mud.

See also 
 Energy policy of the United Kingdom
 Energy use and conservation in the United Kingdom

References 

North Sea energy
Natural gas platforms
Oil and gas industry in Scotland
Oil fields of Scotland
Nature Conservation Marine Protected Areas of Scotland
Shell plc oil and gas fields
ExxonMobil oil and gas fields